The following nations prohibit civilians wearing or possessing camouflage print clothing:
 Antigua and Barbuda
 Bahamas
 Barbados
 Dominica
 Ghana
 Grenada
 Jamaica
 Nigeria
 Oman
 Philippines (uniforms only)
 Saint Lucia
 Saint Vincent and the Grenadines
 Saudi Arabia
 South Africa
 Trinidad and Tobago
 Uganda
 Zambia
 Zimbabwe

References

See also 
 Police impersonation
 Military impostor
 Swiftboating, slang for an unfair or untrue political attack, which sometimes takes the form of falsely accusing a candidate of dishonesty about military service.
Military uniform
Full dress uniform
Mess dress uniform
Service dress uniform
Combat uniform
Physical training uniform

Camouflage
Camouflage clothing
Dress codes
Law-related lists